Jeff Bates is the self-titled third album from American country music artist Jeff Bates. Released in April 2008 on the independent label Black River Entertainment, it has accounted for three non-charting singles: "Don't Hate Me for Lovin' You", "Riverbank" and "One Thing". Bates co-wrote ten of the thirteen songs on the album. Despite not producing a charting single, it peaked at #32 on Top Country Albums.

Track listing
"I Can't Have Nothing Nice" (Jeff Bates, Ben Hayslip, Brandon Kinney) – 3:34
"Lonesome" (Kenny Beard, Casey Beathard, Frank Rogers) – 4:15
"One Thing" (Bates, Jason Matthews, Jim McCormick) – 3:21
"A Country Girl Can" (Bates, Hayslip, Matthews) – 3:06
"Riverbank" (Bates, Robert Arthur, Kirk Roth) – 3:43
"Chevy Don't Let Me Down" (Bates, Hayslip, Jimmy Yeary) – 3:07
"Don't Hate Me for Lovin' You" (Bates, Yeary, Kemi Williams, Lonnie Wilson) – 3:25
"My Wave" (Hayslip, Yeary) – 4:04
"Some Days" (Bates, Beard, Hayslip) – 2:52
"He Wasn't Like Us" (Bates, Hayslip, Kinney) – 3:51
"Dead or Alive" (Bates, Arthur, Roth) – 3:14
"Country Man" (Bates, Beard, Yeary) – 3:27
"Somebody's Falling" (Beard, Deborah Allen, Paul Overstreet) – 3:21

Personnel
Jeff Bates- lead vocals
Eddie Bayers- drums
Kenny Beard- background vocals
Mike Brignardello- bass guitar
Mickey Jack Cones- background vocals
Aly Cutter- background vocals
Glen Duncan- fiddle, mandolin
Larry Franklin- fiddle
Paul Franklin- steel guitar
Tommy Harden- percussion
Buddy Hyatt- piano
Mike Johnson- steel guitar
Wayne Killius- drums
Jeff King- acoustic guitar, electric guitar
Troy Lancaster- electric guitar
Gordon Mote- keyboards, piano
Jimmy Nichols- keyboards, Hammond organ, piano, strings, synthesizer, background vocals
Danny Parks- acoustic guitar
Scotty Sanders- steel guitar
Joe Spivey- fiddle
Bobby Terry- acoustic guitar
Biff Watson- acoustic guitar
Lonnie Wilson- drums

Chart performance

External links
[ Jeff Bates] at Allmusic

2008 albums
Jeff Bates albums
Black River Entertainment albums